Adriana Aleixo Pereira de Barros (born 1976) is a Portuguese and Canadian illustrator, web designer, and poet.

Since 1999, de Barros has created visual poems that combine various disciplines: writing, designing and drawing, sound editing, and filmmaking (through the use of new media, Flash software). Her visual poems have been screened at the American festivals Flashbang! and Flashbang 4 (2001 and 2002), The. ME.Project. (2002; showcased in Toronto, New York and Los Angeles). Her work has appeared in art/poetry books and websites. De Barros has been recognized for "trying to make poetry more dynamic and accessible." Her creations exist as she states, "so that even someone who may dislike poetry can enjoy it visually."

de Barros designs and illustrates at her own studio, Breathewords. And she is also founder and editor of Scene 360, a not-for-profit, online film and arts magazine; since 2000, it has provided numerous insightful interviews and profiles of leading web designers, artists, and filmmakers.

Biography
Born in Caldas da Rainha, Portugal, de Barros moved to Toronto at the age of three. As a child she was mainly interested in sports; and only when she was twelve did she realize her interest in drawing. At age fifteen, her family decided to move back to her birthplace, where de Barros faced cultural challenges with her education and lifestyle.

In high school, she choose to study art and design, deciding to pursue cinema in college. Upset with the lack of sophistication within the film schools and film industry in Portugal, she believes that Toronto "would have been a better location to pursue cinema than in Portugal." She wishes to one day have the opportunity to study filmmaking in North America. Out of high school, she began working temporarily for her family's clothing business. The experience led to a full-time job as a fashion and advertising designer for the company, as well as co-running a copy center with design section.

In 1999, de Barros began web design and programming. She mentions finally finding her place online by "combining various art forms into each project". The Internet providing non-geographical boundaries and easiness for de Barros to write and create English language projects. She began with exploration in frame-by-frame Flash visual poems to founding an online film and arts magazine, Scene 360, where she would write film and art analyses and profile creative individuals.

Not having a formal degree, de Barros is self taught. Today, she still runs her copy center, as she designs in her studio. She is principal and creative director of Breathewords.com. Her work encompasses various media from hand-painted illustrative magazine covers to e-commerce and wacky Flash sites for poets (e.g. HotEmuluv).

Works

Visual poetry
de Barros's interactive narratives and poems have been showcased at design and Flash festivals, and screened on the Internet on places like poemsthatgo ("Winter City Sleeps" and "Blinding Lights", 2001), top design portal K10k ("Freedom of Expression in the Copyright Era" premiered in Issue #131, 2004), and online art gallery Lumen Eclipse ("Invisible"; featured in 2007).

Illustration style and technique
"Her art revolves around issue of daily life, human psychology analysis and colour, and imaginary and surrealist envisionment." She likes to paint portraits of people with distinguishing facial expressions. And objects commonly found in her artwork are hands, angel wings, butterflies, and animals.

de Barros's prominent style is "intentionally leaves portions of her pieces unfinished or with imperfections." She has a dual passion of old era with contemporary living. From inspirations of the Golden Age of Cinema to Renaissance (e.g. unfinished sketches by Leonardo da Vinci). This combined with a Pop Art impression—her paintings of kids in animal masks, Disney characters; and tattoo-styled outlines with bold color backgrounds. Her creative process is noted for its clear difference from a fine artist and cartoon animator, because it many times begins with writing—inspired by a theme, song, daily life interpretation—and then composed into a visual.

De Barros's painting technique is acrylic only to using mixed media with watercolor, color pencils, spray paint, and collage.

Multimedia

De Barros's web designs in both Flash and static media (CSS and HTML) have been featured with design excellence in "HOW Top Ten Links (2003, USA), Web Designing (April 2003, Japan), Taschen's 1000 Favorite Websites (2003, Germany), STEP Inside Design (Issue May/June 2004, USA)
. She has won a Portuguese Multimedia II Award (2005), two SXSW Web Awards nominations (2003 and 2004) a nomination in the 17th Stuttgart Filmwinter New Media Award (2004).". American Institute of Graphic Arts's (AIGA, Cincinnati) has noted her work with a Top Design Site Award, MSN.com with
a Site of the Week and Yahoo! a New and Notable mention.

De Barros is also involved in the design industry, having led a speaker/workshop session about the behind-the-scenes work on her visual poems and films at the OFFF04 convention held in Valencia, Spain. She has continued to do lectures about web design at universities in Portugal.

Interviews
Poetry from Portugal - H2O Magazine
Web Gurus Interviews - Erudition

References

External links
Breathewords - studio website
Scene 360 - online film and arts magazine

1976 births
Living people
People from Caldas da Rainha
21st-century Canadian poets
Flash artists
Canadian digital artists
Women digital artists
Web designers
Barros, Adriana de
Canadian illustrators
21st-century Portuguese poets
Canadian women poets
Canadian people of Portuguese descent
21st-century Canadian women writers
Barros, Adriana de
21st-century Canadian women artists
Women graphic designers
Electronic literature writers